In field theory, a branch of algebra, an algebraic field extension  is called a separable extension if for every , the minimal polynomial of  over  is a separable polynomial (i.e., its formal derivative is not the zero polynomial, or equivalently it has no repeated roots in any extension field). An extension that is not separable is said to be inseparable.

Every algebraic extension of a field of characteristic zero is separable, and every algebraic extension of a finite field is separable.
It follows that most extensions that are considered in mathematics are separable. Nevertheless, the concept of separability is important, as the existence of inseparable extensions is the main obstacle for extending many theorems proved in characteristic zero to non-zero characteristic. For example, the fundamental theorem of Galois theory is a theorem about normal extensions, which remains true in non-zero characteristic only if the extensions are also assumed to be separable.

The opposite concept, a purely inseparable extension, also occurs naturally, as every algebraic extension may be decomposed uniquely as a purely inseparable extension of  a separable extension.

Informal discussion
An arbitrary polynomial  with coefficients in some field  is said to have distinct roots or to be square-free if it has  roots in some extension field .

Every polynomial may be factored in linear factors over an algebraic closure of the field of its coefficients. Therefore, the polynomial does not have distinct roots if and only if it is divisible by the square of a polynomial of positive degree. This is the case if and only if the greatest common divisor of the polynomial and its derivative is not a constant. Thus for testing if a polynomial is square-free, it is not necessary to consider explicitly any field extension nor to compute the roots.

In this context, the case of irreducible polynomials requires some care. A priori, it may seem that being divisible by a square is impossible for an irreducible polynomial, which has no non-constant divisor except itself. Similarly, divisibility by a square depends on the ambient field.

A polynomial such as this one, whose formal derivative is zero, is said to be inseparable. Polynomials that are not inseparable are said to be separable. A separable extension is an extension that may be generated by separable elements, that is elements whose minimal polynomials are separable.

Separable and inseparable polynomials
Let  in  be an irreducible polynomial and  its formal derivative. Then the following are equivalent conditions for the irreducible polynomial  to be separable:

Since the formal derivative of a positive degree polynomial can be zero only if the field has prime characteristic, for an irreducible polynomial to not be separable, its coefficients must lie in a field of prime characteristic.

In this case, the polynomial  is irreducible and inseparable.

More generally, if F is any field of (non-zero) prime characteristic for which the Frobenius endomorphism is not an automorphism, F possesses an inseparable algebraic extension.

A field F is perfect if and only if all irreducible polynomials are separable. This includes every finite field.

Separable elements and separable extensions
Let  be a field extension.

Like the algebraic closure, it is unique up to an isomorphism, and in general, this isomorphism is not unique.

The equivalence of 3. and 1. is known as the primitive element theorem or  Artin's theorem on primitive elements.
Properties 4. and 5. are the basis of Galois theory, and, in particular, of the fundamental theorem of Galois theory.

Separable extensions within algebraic extensions 
Let  be an algebraic extension of fields of characteristic .

By definition,  is perfect if and only if its separable and algebraic closures coincide.

Separability of transcendental extensions 

Separability problems may arise when dealing with transcendental extensions. This is typically the case for algebraic geometry over a field of prime characteristic, where the function field of an algebraic variety has a transcendence degree over the ground field that is equal to the dimension of the variety.

For defining the separability of a transcendental extension, it is natural to use the fact that every field extension is an algebraic extension of a purely transcendental extension. This leads to the following definition.

A finitely generated field extension is separable if and only it has a separating transcendence basis; an extension that is not finitely generated is called separable if every finitely generated subextension has a separating transcendence basis.

The following properties are equivalent:
 is reduced,

Differential criteria 
Separability can be studied with the aid of derivations. Let  be a finitely generated field extension of a field .

and the equality holds if and only if E is separable over F (here "tr.deg" denotes the transcendence degree).

In particular, if  is an algebraic extension, then  if and only if  is separable.

Then  is separable algebraic over  if and only if the matrix  is invertible. In particular, when , this matrix is invertible if and only if  is a separating transcendence basis.

Notes

References
 Borel, A. Linear algebraic groups, 2nd ed.
 P.M. Cohn (2003). Basic algebra
 
 
 
 M. Nagata (1985). Commutative field theory: new edition, Shokabo. (Japanese)

External links

Field extensions

de:Körpererweiterung#Separable Erweiterungen